Hymenothrix loomisii, the Loomis' thimblehead, is a North American species of flowering plant in the daisy family. It grows in the southwestern United States (Arizona, New Mexico, southern Nevada), and also in the Sierra Madre Occidental in western Chihuahua. There have been reports of populations in southern California but these are most likely introductions.

Each head has 10-20 yellow or cream-colored disc flowers but no ray flowers.

References

Bahieae
Flora of Arizona
Flora of Chihuahua (state)
Flora of Nevada
Flora of New Mexico
Plants described in 1849
Flora without expected TNC conservation status